The  Chicago Rush season was the seventh season for the franchise. They looked to win the ArenaBowl again after winning it in 2006 with a 7–9 record.  They won the American Football Conference Central Division with a 12–4 record and qualified for the playoffs as the #2 playoff seed in the conference, losing in the conference championship to the San Jose SaberCats.

Schedule

Regular season

Playoffs

Coaching
Mike Hohensee started his seventh season as head coach of the Rush.

Personnel moves

Acquired

Departures

2007 roster

Stats

Offense

Passing

Rushing

Receiving

Touchdowns

Defense

Special teams

Kick return

Kicking

Playoff Stats

Offense

Quarterback

Running backs

Wide receivers

Special teams

Kick return

Kicking

Regular season

Week 1: at Kansas City Brigade

at Kemper Arena, Kansas City, Missouri

Scoring summary:

1st Quarter:
11:42 – CHI 18 yd Pass to Bobby Sippio from Matt D'Orazio (Failed PAT)
07:21 – KC 1 yd Run by Raymond Philyaw (PAT by Clay Rush)
02:07 – CHI 24 yd Interception Return TD by DeJuan Alfonzo (PAT by Dan Frantz)

2nd Quarter:
12:11 – KC 5 yd Pass to Jerel Myersfrom Raymond Philyaw (PAT by Rush)
11:29 – KC Safety
06:41 – KC 11 yd Pass to Jerel Myers from Raymond Philyaw (PAT by Rush)
01:10 – CHI 2 yd Pass to Bobby Sippio from Matt D'Orazio (Failed PAT by Dan Frantz)

3rd Quarter:

4th Quarter:

Week 2: vs San Jose Sabercats

at Allstate Arena, Chicago

Scoring summary:

1st Quarter:
10:40 CHI – Bobby Sippio 23 yd pass from Matt D'Orazio (Dan Frantz kick) – 7–0 CHI
06:04 SJS – George Williams 5 yd pass from Mark Grieb (A.J. Haglund kick) – 7–7
02:00 CHI – Dan Frantz 56 yd field goal – 10–7 CHI
01:20 SJS – Rodney Wright 43 yd pass from Mark Grieb (A.J. Haglund kick) – 14–10 SJS
00:32 CHI – Jonathan Ordway 57 yd kickoff return (Dan Frantz kick) – 17–14 CHI

2nd Quarter:
03:26 CHI – Bobby Sippio 3 yd pass from Matt D'Orazio (Dan Frantz kick) – 24–14 CHI
00:09 SJS – A.J. Haglund 25 yd field goal – 24–17 CHI
00:00 CHI – Dan Frantz 39 yd field goal – 27–17 CHI

3rd Quarter:
11:20 CHI – Andy McCullough 12 yd pass from Matt D'Orazio (Dan Frantz kick) – 34–17 CHI
05:42 SJS – George Williams 2 yd pass from Mark Grieb (A.J. Haglund kick) – 34–24 CHI

4th Quarter:
14:14 CHI – Bobby Sippio 9 yd pass from Matt D'Orazio (Dan Frantz kick) – 41–24 CHI
09:49 SJS – James Roe 9 yd pass from Mark Grieb (A.J. Haglund kick) – 41–31 CHI
05:58 SJS – James Roe 12 yd pass from Mark Grieb (A.J. Haglund kick) – 41–38 CHI
03:07 CHI – Andy McCullough 8 yd pass from Matt D'Orazio (Dan Frantz kick) – 48–38 CHI
00:43 SJS – Ben Nelson 5 yd pass from Mark Grieb (A.J. Haglund kick) – 48–45 CHI

Week 3: vs New York Dragons

at Allstate Arena, Chicago

Scoring summary:

1st Quarter:
11:34 NYD – Ja'Mar Toombs 1 yd run (Carter Warley kick) – 7–0 NYD
06:44 CHI – Matt D'Orazio 4 yd run (Dan Frantz kick) – 7–7
02:01 NYD – Mike Horacek 4 yd pass from Rohan Davey (Carter Warley kick) – 14–7 NYD

2nd Quarter:
10:13 NYD – Carter Warley 48 yd field goal – 17–7 NYD
09:50 CHI – Jonathan Ordway 55 yd kickoff return (Dan Frantz kick) – 17–14 NYD
07:27 NYD – Kevin Swayne 25 yd pass from Rohan Davey (Carter Warley kick failed) – 23–14 NYD
05:52 CHI – Bobby Sippio 33 yd pass from Matt D'Orazio (Dan Frantz kick) – 23–21 NYD
01:20 CHI – Bobby Sippio 15 yd pass from Matt D'Orazio (Bobby Sippio rush failed) – 27–23 CHI
00:32 NYD – Mike Horacek 29 yd pass from Rohan Davey (Carter Warley kick) – 30–27 NYD

3rd Quarter:
09:24 NYD – Carter Warley 24 yd field goal – 33–27 NYD
06:42 CHI – Bobby Sippio 24 yd pass from Matt D'Orazio (Dan Frantz kick) – 34–33 CHI
00:53 CHI – Ahmad Merritt 9 yd pass from Matt D'Orazio (Dan Frantz kick) – 41–33 CHI

4th Quarter:
13:09 CHI – DeJuan Alfonzo 2 yd fumble recovery (Dan Frantz kick failed) – 47–33 CHI
09:11 CHI – Bobby Sippio 12 yd pass from Matt D'Orazio (Dan Frantz kick) – 54–33 CHI
05:14 CHI – Bobby Sippio 16 yd pass from Matt D'Orazio (Dan Frantz kick) – 61–33 CHI
02:01 NYD – Ja'Mar Toombs 2 yd run (Carter Warley kick) – 61–40 CHI

Week 4: at Columbus Destroyers

at Nationwide Arena, Columbus, Ohio

Scoring summary:

1st Quarter:

2nd Quarter:

3rd Quarter:

4th Quarter:

Week 5: vs Los Angeles Avengers

at Allstate Arena, Chicago

Scoring summary:

1st Quarter:

2nd Quarter:

3rd Quarter:

4th Quarter:

Week 6: at Nashville Kats

at Nashville Arena, Nashville, Tennessee

Scoring summary:

1st Quarter:

2nd Quarter:

3rd Quarter:

4th Quarter:

Week 8: at Grand Rapids Rampage

at Van Andel Arena, Grand Rapids, Michigan

Scoring summary:

1st Quarter:

2nd Quarter:

3rd Quarter:

4th Quarter:

Week 9: vs Philadelphia Soul

at Allstate Arena, Chicago

Scoring summary:

1st Quarter:

2nd Quarter:

3rd Quarter:

4th Quarter:

Week 10: vs Colorado Crush

at Allstate Arena, Chicago

Scoring summary:

1st Quarter:

2nd Quarter:

3rd Quarter:

4th Quarter:

Week 11: at Dallas Desperados

at the American Airlines Center, Dallas, Texas

Scoring summary:

1st Quarter:

2nd Quarter:

3rd Quarter:

4th Quarter:

Week 12: vs Nashville Kats

at Allstate Arena, Chicago

Scoring summary:

1st Quarter:

2nd Quarter:

3rd Quarter:

4th Quarter:

Week 13: at Arizona Rattlers

at the US Airways Center, Phoenix, Arizona

Scoring summary:

1st Quarter:

2nd Quarter:

3rd Quarter:

4th Quarter:

Week 14: at Los Angeles Avengers

at the Staples Center, Los Angeles

Scoring summary:

1st Quarter:
10:46 LA – Remy Hamilton 26 yd field goal – 3–0 LA
06:20 CHI – Rob Mager 19 yd pass from Matt D'Orazio (Dan Frantz kick) – 7–3 CHI
01:47 LA – Terrance Stubbs 10 yd pass from Sonny Cumbie (Remy Hamilton kick failed) – 9–7 LA

2nd Quarter:
14:18 CHI – Matt D'Orazio 6 yd run (Dan Frantz kick) – 14–9 CHI
08:51 LA – Lonnie Ford 1 yd run (Remy Hamilton kick) – 16–14 LA
04:49 CHI – DeJuan Alvonzo 10 yd pass from Matt D'Orazio – 20–16 CHI
00:33 LA – LaShaun Ward 13 yd pass from Sonny Cumbie (Remy Hamilton kick) – 23–20 LA
00:22 LA – Robert Quiroga 0 yd fumble recovery (Remy Hamilton kick) – 30–20 LA

3rd Quarter:
06:40 CHI – Joe Peters 1 yd run (Dan Frantz kick) – 30–27 LA
02:04 LA – Sonny Cumbie 5 yd run (Remy Hamilton kick) – 37–27 LA

4th Quarter:
14:55 CHI – Rob Mager 19 yd pass from Matt D'Orazio (DeJuan Alvonzo pass failed) – 37–33 LA
12:31 LA – Rob Turner 21 yd pass from Sonny Cumbie (Remy Hamilton kick) – 44–33 LA
09:12 CHI – Bob McMillen 3 yd pass from Matt D'Orazio (Dan Frantz kick failed) – 44–39 LA
05:20 LA – Remy Hamilton 33 yd field goal – 47–39 LA
04:16 CHI – Rob Mager 20 yd pass from Matt D'Orazio (Matt D'Orazio rush) – 47–47
00:00 LA – Remy Hamilton 29 yd field goal – 50–47 LA

Attendance: 13,142

Week 15: vs Grand Rapids Rampage

at Allstate Arena, Chicago

Scoring summary:

1st Quarter:

2nd Quarter:

3rd Quarter:

4th Quarter:

Week 16: at Colorado Crush

at the Pepsi Center, Denver

Scoring summary:

1st Quarter:

2nd Quarter:

3rd Quarter:

4th Quarter:

Week 17: vs Kansas City Brigade

at Allstate Arena, Chicago

Scoring summary:

1st Quarter:

2nd Quarter:

3rd Quarter:

4th Quarter:

Playoffs

Round 2: vs (4) Los Angeles Avengers

at Allstate Arena, Chicago

Scoring summary:

1st Quarter:

2nd Quarter:

3rd Quarter:

4th Quarter:

Conference Championship: at (1) San Jose SaberCats

at HP Pavilion, San Jose, California

External links

Chicago Rush
Chicago Rush seasons
Chicago Rush